The  was the main sea-going component of the Imperial Japanese Navy. Until 1933, the Combined Fleet was not a permanent organization, but a temporary force formed for the duration of a conflict or major naval maneuvers from various units normally under separate commands in peacetime.

History

Sino-Japanese War (1894–95)
The Combined Fleet was formally created for the first time on 18 July 1894 by the merger of the Standing Fleet and the Western Fleet. The Standing Fleet (also known as the Readiness Fleet) contained the navy's most modern and combat-capable warships. The Western Fleet was a reserve force consisting primarily of obsolete ships deemed unsuitable for front-line combat operations, but still suitable for commerce protection and coastal defense. Vice-admiral Itō Sukeyuki was appointed the first Commander-in-Chief of the Combined Fleet for the duration of the first Sino-Japanese War against China.

Russo-Japanese War (1904–05)

The Combined Fleet was re-formed during the Russo-Japanese War of 1904–05 to provide a unified overall command for the three separate fleets in the Imperial Japanese Navy. The 1st Fleet was the main battleship force, which formed the backbone of the navy and was intended to be used in a traditional line of battle showdown with an equivalent enemy battleship fleet (Kantai Kessen). The 2nd Fleet was a fast, mobile strike force with armored cruisers and protected cruisers. The 3rd Fleet was primarily a reserve fleet of obsolete vessels considered too weak for front-line combat service, but which could still be used in the operation to blockade Port Arthur. Admiral Tōgō Heihachirō was commander-in-chief of the Combined Fleet during the Russo-Japanese War.

Interwar years
The Combined Fleet was not maintained as a permanent organization, but was temporarily created when necessary during fleet maneuvers or when called for by extraordinary circumstances. Thus, during the period from 1905 to 1924, the Combined Fleet was created only sporadically as the occasion or circumstances dictated, and disbanded immediately afterwards.

In 1924, the Imperial Japanese Navy declared in an edict on fleet organization that "for the time being" the Combined Fleet would be a standing organization consisting of the IJN 1st Fleet and IJN 2nd Fleet. As this was not intended to be "permanent" and since the commander of IJN 1st Fleet concurrently directed the Combined Fleet, the Combined Fleet was not given a Headquarters staff of its own.

From 1933, with the Mukden Incident and the increasing tension with China, a permanent HQ staff for the Combined Fleet was established. By the late 1930s, it included most of Japan's warships—only the base units, the Special Naval Landing Forces, and the China Area Fleet lay outside the Combined Fleet.

World War II

The Combined Fleet came under direct command of the Imperial General Headquarters in 1937. With the start of the Pacific War with the attack on Pearl Harbor carried out by Combined Fleet's Kido Butai (1st Air Fleet), the Combined Fleet became almost synonymous with the Imperial Japanese Navy, under the command of admiral Isoroku Yamamoto till April 1943 when he died after his plane was shot-down by US air forces over Bougainville Island.  It comprised the battleships, aircraft carriers, aircraft, and the components that made up the main fighting strength of the IJN. It was first mobilized on the whole for the Battle of Midway.  After the devastating carrier losses at Midway and in the Solomon Islands campaign, the navy re-organized into a number of "Area Fleets" for local operational control of various geographic zones. The Combined Fleet then evolved into more of an administrative organization.

As the war situation deteriorated for the Japanese and the territories controlled by the "Area Fleets" fell one after another to the United States Navy, the Imperial General Headquarters and the Imperial Japanese Navy General Staff acted to force the American fleet into a "decisive battle" in the Philippines per the Kantai Kessen philosophy.  In the resultant Battle of the Philippine Sea and the Battle of Leyte Gulf the Japanese fleet was severely depleted.  The remnants of the Combined Fleet fled to Okinawa, but further operations were hindered by lack of fuel and air cover.  By the time of the final suicide mission of the battleship Yamato in Operation Ten-Go, the Combined Fleet had ceased to exist as an effective combat force.

Commander-in-Chief (司令長官, Shireichōkan)

Chief of Staff (参謀長, Sanbōchō)

See also
1st Air Fleet

Footnotes

References

Notes

Books

External links 

World War II Armed Forces – Orders of Battle and Organizations
Nihon Kaigun

Fleets of the Imperial Japanese Navy
Military units and formations established in 1894
Military units and formations disestablished in 1945